Facer may refer to:

Geography
Facer, St. Catharines city of St. Catharines, Ontario

Machinery
rotating pipe cutter
Advanced Facer-Canceler System used by the US Postal Service to cull, face, and cancel letter mail

People
Frank Facer, Australian rugby league footballer and administrator
Jada Facer, American actress 
Cecil Facer Secondary School

Music
Facer (song), a 1995 single by German band X Marks the Pedwalk